The Ševčík-Lhotský String Quartet was a well-known Czech musical ensemble that was founded as the Ševčík Quartet at Warsaw in 1903 that continued to the 1930s.

Personnel 
The founding members of the quartet were:

1st violin: Bohuslav Lhotský
2nd violin: Karel Procházka
viola: Karel Moravec
violoncello: Bohuslav Váska (until 1911), succeeded by Ladislav Zelenka (until 1914), and by Antonio Fingerland.

Origins 
Bohuslav Lhotský, Karel Procházka and Karel Moravec were all pupils of the Czech violin teacher Otakar Ševčík (b. 1852), who had control of the violin department at the Prague Conservatory between 1892 and 1901. The master's method was based on the semitone system, the fingers remaining at equal distances on all the strings during the technical studies, leading to great safety, precision and fluency in performance. Following the success of his pupil Jan Kubelík, his students gathered in great numbers at his residence at Písek. This quartet was the later counterpart of the Bohemian or Czech Quartet, which was formed by four pupils of the Prague cello professor Hanuš Wihan a decade previously.

They gave the premiere of Bohuslav Martinů's first string quartet in 1927.

Recordings 
(as 'Sevcikovo-Lhotskeho Quartet')
 Dvořák: Quartet no 6 in F major op 96 (HMV 78rpm European issue, AN 332-334).
 Smetana: Quartet no 1 in E minor (HMV 78 rpm European issue, AN 326-329).
 Glazunov: Quartet no 4 in A minor op 64, Scherzo (HMV 78rpm, European, AN 339).
 Borodin: Quartet no 2, Nocturne (HMV 78rpm, European, AN 339).

References

Sources 
 A. Eaglefield-Hull, A Dictionary of Modern Music and Musicians (Dent, London 1924).
 R.D. Darrell, The Gramophone Shop Encyclopedia of Recorded Music (New York 1936).

Czech string quartets
Musical groups established in 1903
1903 establishments in Poland
1903 establishments in the Russian Empire